Donald Sigmund Stralem (1903-1976) was an American investment banker and philanthropist. Stralem worked as a partner in Hallgarten & Company and then served as chairman of Stralem and Company, an international investment bank that he founded in 1967. He also co-founded the North Shore Hospital in Manhasset, New York.

Early life and education
Stralem was born to a Jewish family, in Port Washington, New York on Long Island on June 28, 1903 to Casimir Ignace Stralem and Edithe Alice (Neustadt) Stralem (his father had changed the family surname from Strahlheim to Stralem in 1901). He graduated from the Morristown School in Morristown, New Jersey (now the Morristown-Beard School) in 1920. Stralem then completed his bachelor's degree at Harvard University in Cambridge, Massachusetts in 1924. While at Harvard, Stralem participated in the Morristown School Club, an affinity group at the university. He later served on the Committee of Overseers for the Fogg Art Museum at Harvard. Stralem did his graduate studies at the Trinity College at the University of Cambridge in Cambridge, England.

Travelers aid work

Stralem worked as a leading figure in the travelers aid movement. He served as president of the Travelers Aid Society of New York (TASNY) for six years  and then served as its vice president. Stralem served as  president of the National Travelers Aid Association  and chaired their 1950 biennial convention. Recognizing the impact of his philanthropy on the local area, New York City named him as an honorary deputy commissioner of the Fire Department.

Philanthropy

Stralem served a president of the United Service Organizations Fund of New York. He also served as president and chairman of the George Junior Republic Association (GJRA) and as a member of the advisory board of the Girl Scouts of America's New York chapter. GJRA provided citizenship training for children.

Board service

Stralem served on the Board of Directors of film production corporations, including Columbia Pictures Corporation and Screen Gems. He chaired the Finance Committee of Sony Pictures' Board. Stralem also served on the Board of Directors of telecommunication companies (e.g., Continental Telephone Company, Independent telephone company) and industrial companies (e.g., Atlantic Gulf Petroleum, United States Leather Company, Stahl-Meyer)

Family

Stralem married Jean Lehman Ickelheimer, a member of the Lehman family that ran the Lehman Brothers investment bank, on April 11, 1928. They had two daughters, Sandra Stralem Russell (married to Robert A. Russell) and Lynn Stralem. Jean Stralem owned an extensive private art collection, which featured works by Pablo Picasso, Henri-Émile-Benoît Matisse, Edgar Degas, and Pierre-Auguste Renoir. She also collected rare first-edition children's books and miniature furniture. Paralleling her husband's philanthropy, Jean Stralem served on the board of directors of the American Theatre Wing and Lighthouse International in New York City. She served as vice president of Lighthouse International in 1973 and then as vice chairman. Jean Stralem also served as a vice chairman of Seeing Eye's 1938 fundraising campaign.

Athletics

Stralem competed in tennis against other investment bankers. He was a finalist in the 1951 tournament held by the Bond Club of New York, an association of Wall Street executives.

References

American investment bankers
Philanthropists from New York (state)
Jewish American philanthropists
Harvard University alumni
People from Port Washington, New York
1903 births
1976 deaths
20th-century American businesspeople
Lehman family
Morristown-Beard School alumni
American male tennis players